Metropolitan Herman may refer to

 Herman of Kazan and Svyazhsk, Metropolitan of Moscow and all Russia in 1566–1568
 Herman (Swaiko), Primate of the Orthodox Church in America in 2002–2008